Kimpton Rouge Hotel is a 137-room boutique hotel located at 16th Street Northwest and Rhode Island Avenue in Washington, D.C.  Located at Scott Circle across from the Australian embassy, Hotel Rouge is one of 11 Kimpton hotel properties in the Washington Metropolitan Area. Originally a 1967 apartment building and then a Quality hotel, Kimpton Rouge Hotel opened on December 14, 2001 and is owned by LaSalle Hotel Properties of Bethesda, Maryland. The building was purchased in 2001 and underwent a $14 million renovation along with the nearby Topaz Hotel.

History
Kimpton hired Mike Moore, a product designer and interior decorator, to come up with the hotel's name and design. Moore chose "Rouge" and the crimson color scheme that is throughout the hotel after watching the film Moulin Rouge. Red walls, leopard print carpeting, white upholstery furniture, white shag carpets, and photographs of women were inspired by interior designers Jean-Michel Frank, Albert Hadley, and Philippe Starck.

Features
The hotel features 137 rooms and a hotel lounge, that serves breakfast, dinner and late night drinks, called Bar Rouge.

See also
 List of public art in Washington, D.C., Ward 2

References

External links
 Bar Rouge
 Wmporis

Hotel Rouge
R
Hotels in Washington, D.C.
Hotels established in 2002
Hotel Rouge